The Shire of Buninyong was a local government area south and southeast of the regional city of Ballarat, Victoria, Australia.

History

Buninyong was first incorporated as a road district on 9 July 1858, and became a shire on 18 February 1864. On 1 October 1915, it absorbed the Borough of Buninyong, which had been created on 15 July 1859.

On 6 May 1994, the Shire of Buninyong was abolished, and was split between the newly created City of Ballarat and Shire of Moorabool. A small section near Grenville was transferred to the newly created Golden Plains Shire.

Wards

The Shire of Buninyong was divided into three ridings, each of which elected three councillors:
 Centre Riding
 West Riding
 Northeast Riding

Towns and localities
 Buninyong*
 Cambrian Hill
 Canadian
 Clarendon
 Dunnstown
 Durham Lead
 Elaine
 Grenville
 Lal Lal
 Magpie
 Millbrook
 Mount Clear
 Mount Helen
 Scotchman
 Warrenheip
 Yendon

* Council seat.

Population

* Estimate in 1958 Victorian Year Book.

References

External links
 Victorian Places - Buninyong Shire

Buninyong